Pichia (Hansenula and Hyphopichia are obsolete synonyms) is a genus of yeasts in the family Pichiaceae with spherical, elliptical, or oblong acuminate cells. Pichia is a teleomorph, and forms hat-shaped, hemispherical, or round ascospores during sexual reproduction. The anamorphs of some Pichia species are Candida species. The asexual reproduction is by multilateral budding.

The genus name of Pichia is in honour of Pico Pichi (1862-1933), who was an Italian botanist and Professor of natural history and plant pathology at a viticulture school in the town of Conegliano in the Province of Treviso. 

The genus was circumscribed by Emil Christian Hansen in Centralbl. Bakteriol., 2. Abt., 12 on pages 533-538 in 1904.

Lactose is neither fermented nor assimilated by these species. The behaviour with regard to other carbohydrates is dependent on the different species. Nitrate is always assimilated.

More than 100 species of this genus are known. GBIF lists 155. Although some genera have been re-assigned from Pichia genera to the Wickerhamomyces; such as Wickerhamomyces canadensis, W. ciferri, W. lynferdii, W. salvicola and W. subpelliculosa. Many other Pichia genera have also been re-assigned to various genera such as; Starmera, Cyberlindnera, Ogataea and others. Species Fungorum accepts only 32 species (see below for list).

Some of them interfere with the fermentation process for alcohol production. In winemaking, some species of Pichia can create potential faults in wines. Most are found in decaying plants; some live in close symbiosis with insects, which live on decaying plants.

Some Pichia representatives can be found in raw milk and cheese, such as P. anomala (formerly named Hansenula anomala).  P. anomala has been shown to combat the undesirable mold Aspergillus flavus, which contaminates food sources such as tree nuts and corn, and produces aflatoxins.  Researchers of the Agricultural Research Service found that when pistachio trees were treated with P. anomala, the growth of A. flavus was inhibited up to 97%.  In addition to inhibiting A. flavus, the yeast may also help protect other agricultural crops from unwanted molds that affect the crop’s taste, texture, yield, and safety. In smeared-surface ripened cheese, the most important species is P. membranifaciens that also occurs on cream cheese. The formation of a so-called pellicle is typical. Another member of the genus, P. pastoris, is widely used in molecular biology and biotechnology as an expression system. P. angusta furthermore called Hansenula polymorpha, is a model organism for studying the functions of peroxisomes and their underlying molecular biology.

Some Pichia species (e.g. P. ohmeri) have recently been clinically proven to be pathogens, better known as so-called opportunistic pathogens in immunocompromised humans.

Species
As accepted by Species Fungorum;

 Pichia barkeri 
 Pichia cactophila 
 Pichia cecembensis 
 Pichia cephalocereana 
 Pichia deserticola 
 Pichia eremophila 
 Pichia exigua 
 Pichia fermentans 
 Pichia galeiformis 
 Pichia garciniae 
 Pichia gijzeniarum 
 Pichia heedii 
 Pichia kluyveri 
 Pichia megalospora 
 Pichia membranifaciens 
 Pichia methanothermo 
 Pichia myanmarensis 
 Pichia nakasei 
 Pichia nanzhaoensis 
 Pichia nongkratonensis 
 Pichia norvegensis 
 Pichia occidentalis 
 Pichia paraexigua 
 Pichia porticicola 
 Pichia pseudocactophila 
 Pichia punctispora 
 Pichia rarassimilans 
 Pichia scaptomyzae 
 Pichia scutulata 
 Pichia sporocuriosa 
 Pichia terricola 
 Pichia uvarum

References

External links 
Pichia at Dr Fungus
Pichia in MycoBank.org

Saccharomycetaceae
Yeasts
Yeasts used in brewing